América Futebol Clube (SP), also known as América de Rio Preto or simply América, is a Brazilian football team based in São José do Rio Preto, São Paulo. Founded in 1946, it plays in Campeonato Paulista Segunda Divisão.

It was named after America from Rio de Janeiro, even copying their team badge.

History
On January 28, 1946,  at Hotel São Paulo, Antônio Tavares Pereira Lima, an Estrada de Ferro Araraquarense (EFA, Araraquara city Railroad) engineer, Vitor Buongermino and 53 local sportsmen and columnists of two local newspapers (A Folha de Rio Preto and A Notícia) founded the club to rival the city's only team at the time, Bancários. The club was named América Futebol Clube. The other suggested names were Dínamo and Flamengo.

On March 17, 1946, América played its first match. América beat Ferroviária of Araraquara 3–1. América's first goal ever was scored by Quirino. América's starting eleven were Bob, Hugo and Edgar, De Lúcia, Quirino and Miguelzinho, Morgero, Dema, Pereira Lima, Fordinho and Birigui. Nelsinho substituted Pereira Lima during the match.

In 1957, the club won its first title, the Campeonato Paulista Second Level, finishing ahead of São Bento. The club was promoted to the following year's first level.

In 1978, América competed in the Campeonato Brasileiro Série A for the first time, finishing in 38th position.

In 1980, the club competed in the Campeonato Brasileiro Série A for the second time, finishing in the 32nd position.

In 2006, América won the Copa São Paulo de Juniores, beating Comercial of Ribeirão Preto in the final.

Current squad (selected)

Achievements
 Campeonato Paulista Série A2:
 Winners (3): 1957, 1963, 1999
 Copa São Paulo de Juniores:
 Winners (1): 2006

Stadium

América's home stadium is Estádio Benedito Teixeira, usually known as Teixeirão, inaugurated in 1996, with a maximum capacity of 36,426 people.

The club also owns a training ground, named Centro de Treinamento Sami Gorayb, and nicknamed Toca do Rubro (meaning Red's Burrow).

Club colors
América's official club colors are red and white. The club's home kit is composed of a red shirt, white short and red socks.

Anthem
The club's official anthem lyrics was composed by  Walter Benfatti and the music's author was Roberto Farath. There is another anthem, created to celebrate the club's 50th anniversary. This anthem lyrics was composed by José Celso Colturato Barbeiro and the music by Edson Crepaldi and Fernando Marques Alves .

Mascot
América's mascot is a red devil, called Diabo.

References

External links
 América's official website

 
Association football clubs established in 1946
Football clubs in São Paulo (state)
1946 establishments in Brazil